Saint-Jorioz, located on the western banks of lake Annecy, is a commune in the Haute-Savoie department in the Auvergne-Rhône-Alpes region in south-eastern France.

Population

World heritage site
It is home to one or more prehistoric pile-dwelling (or stilt house) settlements that are part of the Prehistoric Pile dwellings around the Alps UNESCO World Heritage Site.

See also
Communes of the Haute-Savoie department

References

Communes of Haute-Savoie